Marcia Llyneth Griffiths (born 23 November 1949) is a Jamaican singer. One reviewer described her by noting "she is known primarily for her strong, smooth-as-mousse love songs and captivating live performances".

Biography
Born in West Kingston, Jamaica, Griffiths started her career in 1964, performing on stage with Byron Lee and the Dragonaires at the behest of Phillip James of The Blues Busters, who had heard her singing in her home neighbourhood. Her performance was sufficiently impressive that the following day Ronnie Nasralla and Clement Dodd both offered her recording contracts. She chose to record for Dodd's Studio One label, where she recorded a series of duets with male singers such as Tony Gregory ("You're Mine"), Bob Marley ("Oh My Darling"), Jeff Dixon ("Words"), and Bob Andy ("Always Together"), with whom she would have a relationship lasting several years. In 1968 she had her first success as a solo artist, with "Feel Like Jumping", which like her other early Studio One solo hits (including "Truly" and "Melody Life"), were written by Andy.

From 1970 to 1974, she worked together with Bob Andy as a duo (Bob and Marcia), on the Harry J label. She also recorded for Lloyd Charmers.

Between 1974 and 1981, she was a member of the I Threes, a trio of backing singers, which supported Bob Marley & the Wailers.
She continued to record as a solo artist throughout the 1970s, working with producers such as Sonia Pottinger, and Joseph Hoo Kim.

In 1983, she released her re-recording of the Bunny Wailer song "Electric Boogie", originally recorded and released by Wailer in 1976.  Although the 1983 version became a minor hit for Griffiths, the song was remixed in 1989, and it was this version that made the Electric Slide, a line dance, an international dance craze. It reached number 51 on the US Billboard Hot 100, making it her most successful single. It is currently the highest-selling single by a female reggae singer of all time. She has more recently had further hits with producer Donovan Germain.

She had two children with JBC disc jockey Errol Thompson, and raised them alone after his death in 1983.

Griffiths was featured on the album True Love by Toots and the Maytals, which won the Grammy Award in 2004 for Best Reggae Album, and showcased many notable musicians including Willie Nelson, Eric Clapton, Jeff Beck, Trey Anastasio, Gwen Stefani / No Doubt, Ben Harper, Bonnie Raitt, Manu Chao, The Roots, Ryan Adams, Keith Richards, Toots Hibbert, Paul Douglas, Jackie Jackson, Ken Boothe, and The Skatalites.

Griffiths appeared in the 2011 documentary Reggae Got Soul: The Story of Toots and the Maytals which was featured on BBC and described as "The untold story of one of the most influential artists ever to come out of Jamaica".

A Brazilian documentary film about Griffiths, Reggae Meets Samba, was in production as of December 2013.

In January 2014, she announced that as part of her fiftieth year in the music business she would be releasing an album of her favorite songs by other artists, Songs That Inspire Me, Songs I Love to Sing, recorded with Germain.

In August 2014, it was announced that Griffiths would receive the Jamaican Order of Distinction (Commander class) in October that year.

In January 2018, Griffiths signed an exclusive booking deal with New York-based Donsome Records' booking agency.

Discography 
 Sweet Bitter Love (1974)
 Naturally (1978)
 Steppin (1979)
 Rock My Soul (1984)
 Marcia (1988)
 Carousel (1990)
 Indomitable (1995)
 Land of Love (1997)
 Collectors Series (1998)
 Truly (1998)
 Certified (1999)
 Reggae Max (2003)
 Shining Time (2005)
 Melody Life (2007)
 Marcia Griffiths & Friends (2012)
 Timeless (2019)

References

External links

 Marvin Sparks, "Marcia Griffiths remembers Bob Marley on 30th anniversary of passing | Interview", Soul Culture, 11 May 2011.

1949 births
Living people
21st-century Jamaican women singers
20th-century Jamaican women singers
Musicians from Kingston, Jamaica
Jamaican reggae singers
The Wailers members
Trojan Records artists
Commanders of the Order of Distinction
VP Records artists